The 1978-79 2nd Bundesliga season was the sixth season of the 2nd Bundesliga, the second level of ice hockey in Germany. Twelve teams participated in the league, and Duisburger SC  won the championship, and was promoted to the Ice hockey Bundesliga as a result. ERC Freiburg was also promoted. EV Pfronten and EC Peiting were relegated to the Oberliga.

Regular season

References

External links
Season on hockeyarchives.info

2nd Bundesliga (ice hockey) seasons
2